Aankiliyude Tharattu is a 1987 Indian Malayalam-language film, directed by Cochin Haneefa. The film stars Mammootty, Revathi and Rahman.  The film is about a love-affair between a married man and a young lady which leads to a murder. The film was dubbed into Tamil language as Andha Vaanam Saktchi.

Cast
Mammootty as Haridas
Revathi as Sunitha Menon
Rahman as Babu
Shari as Sridevi
Lalu Alex as Rajesh
Jose Prakash as Ramachandra Menon
Cochin Haneefa as Sudhir
Meena as Gomathi
Innocent as "Thavala" Mathai
Manorama as Sakunthala
Janardhanan as Stanley
Jose
 Santhakumari as Sarada
Ragini

Soundtrack
The music was composed by Shyam and the lyrics were written by Poovachal Khader.

References

External links
 
 https://web.archive.org/web/20120322210252/http://popcorn.oneindia.in/title/6558/aankiliyude-tharattu.html

1980s Malayalam-language films
1987 films
1980s crime films